

Best Use of Music in a Film

2000s

2010s

Best Original Score

2010s

2020s

Boston Society of Film Critics Awards
Film awards for best score